Wonder Girls is a South Korean girl group.

Wonder girls may also refer to:

 MTV Wonder Girls, reality show based on the Wonder Girls
 The Wondergirls, a short-lived rock supergroup and side project formed in 1999

See also 
 Wonder Girl, alias of multiple superheroines featured in comic books published by DC Comics